David Jason Green (born June 5, 1975) is a Canadian former professional baseball pitcher who played for the Houston Astros of Major League Baseball (MLB) in .

External links

1975 births
Living people
Auburn Astros players
Baseball people from Ontario
Baseball players at the 1999 Pan American Games
Canada national baseball team players
Canadian expatriate baseball players in the United States
Gulf Coast Astros players
Houston Astros players
Jackson Generals (Texas League) players
Kissimmee Cobras players
Major League Baseball pitchers
Major League Baseball players from Canada
New Orleans Zephyrs players
Pan American Games bronze medalists for Canada
Pan American Games medalists in baseball
People from Northumberland County, Ontario
Quad Cities River Bandits players
Round Rock Express players
Medalists at the 1999 Pan American Games